The 1896–97 British Home Championship was an international football tournament between the British Home Nations. It was won by Scotland after a late goal at The Crystal Palace which beat England to the trophy despite England's dominance of the competition up to that point. Ireland came third despite conceding 14 goals and Wales finished last having picked up only one point.

England began the tournament the strongest, scoring six without reply against the Irish in Belfast with Fred Wheldon claiming a hat-trick. Ireland recovered in the second match however, a high-scoring affair against Wales in which the Irish just claimed a 4–3 victory. Wales too improved in their second match, forcing a draw from Scotland in Wrexham, before Scotland too improved, beating Ireland 5–1 at home to temporarily take the top of the table. England surpassed them in the penultimate match, winning 4–0 over Wales and needing only a draw in the final game at home against Scotland to win the tournament. Scotland however were more than a match for the English and scored late to claim their 2–1 victory and win the trophy.

Table

Results

References

Winning squad

References

British
Home
Home
Home
British Home Championships
Brit
Brit